The Serb List is a Serb minority political party in Kosovo. It was the dominant Serb party in Kosovo politics, claiming all ten of Assembly seats reserved for the community, from 2014 until all its members resigned and withdrew in 2022. The party retains close links to the Government of Serbia, led by the populist Serbian Progressive Party and President Aleksandar Vučić.

History
The combined number of votes for the Serb List was 38,169 (5.30%) at the 2014 Kosovan parliamentary election. On 17 September 2014, the Serb List announced that they would join the government cabinet only if Vetëvendosje was not part of it. Aleksandar Jablanović, the Minister for Returns and Communities in the Government of Kosovo, was dismissed on 3 February 2015, after the opposition demanded his dismissal after he called the group of ethnic Albanians who attacked Serb IDPs in Gjakova with stones on Christmas Eve "savages". His statement contributed to the 2015 Kosovo protests. The Serb List decided not to attend the next Kosovo assembly session. Following the 2017 Kosovan parliamentary election, the Serb List agreed to form the Government of Kosovo led by Ramush Haradinaj of Alliance for the Future of Kosovo, allegedly under main condition that the Community of Serb Municipalities be established.

Parliamentary elections

Municipal parliaments 

Serb List formed local government in all 10 Serb majority municipalities in Kosovo after the 2017 Kosovan local elections.

Presidents of the Serb List

See also
 Community of Serb Municipalities
 Serbian Progressive Party
 Office for Kosovo and Metohija

Notes

References

External links
 

Serb political parties in Kosovo
Serb organizations
Political parties established in 2014
2014 establishments in Kosovo
National conservative parties
Serbian Progressive Party